Pyxine katendei is a species of corticolous (rock-dwelling), foliose lichen in the family Caliciaceae. Found in East Africa, it was scientifically described as a new species in 1975 by lichenologists Dougal Swinscow and Hildur Krog. The lichen has a whitish to pale grey thallus that is tightly appressed to its substrate. The  comprising the thallus are somewhat convex; they lack pseudocyphellae (tiny pores for air exchange), and have sparse pruina. The thallus underside is black; the internal medulla is white. The lichen contains triterpenoid compounds as well as lichexanthone; the latter substance causes the lichen to fluoresce when lit with a long-wavelength UV light.

References

Caliciales
Lichen species
Lichens described in 1975
Lichens of East Tropical Africa
Taxa named by Hildur Krog